Sulphur Peak is a summit in the south end of the Pavant Range in Millard County, Utah.  It reaches an elevation of

References

External links
 

Mountains of Millard County, Utah
Mountains of Utah